Tabletop may refer to:

Mountains
Table Top Mountain in Rangeville, Queensland, Australia
 Table Top Mountain (New York)
 Table Mountain in Cape Town, South Africa
 Tepui, flat top mountains in South America

Places
 Tabletop, New South Wales
 Table Top, New South Wales

Games
 TableTop, an Internet-based show about board games
 The general concept of tabletop games, which encompasses several classes of games that can also be referred to individually as "Tabletop", including:
 Tabletop role-playing games, as opposed to role-playing video games
 Board games
 Card games
 Tabletop wargaming
 Tabletop football

Other
 The top of a table (furniture)
 Tabletop runway, a type of runway
 Table computer, a large-display portable all-in-one computer
 "Tabletop", a song on the Doubleclicks' 2014 album Dimetrodon
 Table Tops, a free newspaper for Australian Army troops in World War II